Melissa Lotholz  (born December 2, 1992) is a Canadian bobsledder.

In her rookie season, Lotholz pushed Kaillie Humphries to 3 World Cup medals. The following season the duo won 9 medals in as many races, including silver at World Championships, to secure the overall title. Altogether Humphries and Lotholz went on to win 2 World Championship medals, 17 World Cup medals and four crystal globes in 4 years. On January 9, 2016, Lotholz was part of the first all-female team to compete against men in a four-person World Cup bobsled race; her teammates were Kaillie Humphries (pilot), Cynthia Appiah, and Genevieve Thibault. In 2018 Lotholz competed at the 2018 Winter Olympics with pilot Christine de Bruin, where they finished 7th. Following the Olympic season, Lotholz switched from her role as brakeman to pilot.

In January 2022, Lotholz was named to Canada's 2022 Olympic team.

Career highlights
World Championships
2016 – Igls,  2nd with Kaillie Humphries
2017 – Königssee,  2nd with Kaillie Humphries

FIBT (IBSF) World Cup Overall Season Championship
Second,  overall in the 2014–15 FIBT World Cup season with Kaillie Humphries
First,  overall in the 2015–16 FIBT World Cup season with Kaillie Humphries
Second,  overall in the 2016-17 FIBT World Cup season with Kaillie Humphries
First,  overall in the 2017-18 FIBT World Cup season with Kaillie Humphries

References

External links

1992 births
Living people
Canadian female bobsledders
People from Barrhead, Alberta
Sportspeople from Alberta
Bobsledders at the 2018 Winter Olympics
Bobsledders at the 2022 Winter Olympics
Olympic bobsledders of Canada
21st-century Canadian women